The 2022 Pahang state election, formally the 15th Pahang state election, took place on 19 November 2022. This election was to elect 42 members of the 15th Pahang State Legislative Assembly. The previous assembly was dissolved on 14 October 2022. The election for the Tioman (state constituency) was delayed to 7 December following the death of the Perikatan candidate.

The election resulted in a hung parliament with Perikatan Nasional emerging as the largest bloc, one seat ahead of the ruling Barisan Nasional coalition government.

On 27 November, one week after the election, it was announced that Wan Rosdy Wan Ismail would be reappointed as Menteri Besar at the head of a coalition government consisting of Barisan Nasional and Pakatan Harapan.

Constituencies

Composition before dissolution

Timeline

Retiring incumbent 
The following members of the 14th State Legislative Assembly retired.

Electoral candidates 
The official list published on 5 November 2022 by Election Commission (SPR).

Results

By parliamentary constituency
Perikatan Nasional won 8 of 14 parliamentary constituency.

Seats that changed allegiance

See also 
 2022 Malaysian general election
 Politics of Malaysia
 List of political parties in Malaysia

Notes

References 

2022 elections in Malaysia
2022
2022 in Malaysia
2022 in Malaysian politics
November 2022 events in Malaysia